The 2013–14 Big 12 men's basketball season will begin with practices in October 2013, followed by the start of the regular-season in November. Conference play is scheduled to begin in early-January 2014, and conclude in March with the 2014 Big 12 men's basketball tournament at the Sprint Center in Kansas City.

Preseason

() first place votes

Pre-Season All-Big 12 Teams

Player of the Year: Marcus Smart, Oklahoma State
Newcomer of the Year: Tarik Black, Kansas
Freshman of the Year: Andrew Wiggins, Kansas

Rankings

Conference Schedules

Conference matrix
This table summarizes the head-to-head results between teams in conference play during the regular season. Records in parentheses are head-to-head results between teams in conference play during the regular season and in the post-season conference tournament.

Baylor

|-
!colspan=9 style="background:#004834; color:#FDBB2F;" |Big 12 Regular Season
|-

   

|-
!colspan=9 style="background:#004834; color:#FDBB2F;" | 2014 Big 12 Men's Basketball tournament

Iowa State

|-
!colspan=9 style="background:#840A2C; color:#FEC938;" |Big 12 Regular Season
|-

|-

|-
!colspan=9 style="background:#840A2C; color:#FEC938;"| 2014 Big 12 Men's Basketball tournament

Kansas

|-
!colspan=12 style="background:#00009C; color:red;"| Big 12 Regular Season

|-
!colspan=9 style="background:#00009C; color:#red;"| 2014 Big 12 Men's Basketball tournament

Kansas State

|-
!colspan=12 style="background:#512888; color:#FFFFFF;"| Big 12 Regular Season

|-
!colspan=12 style="background:#512888; color:#FFFFFF;"| 2014 Big 12 Men's Basketball tournament

Oklahoma

|-
! colspan=9 style="background:#960018; color:#FFFDD0;"| Big 12 Regular Season

|-
! colspan=9 style="background:#960018; color:#FFFDD0;"| 2014 Big 12 Men's Basketball tournament

Oklahoma State

|-
!colspan=9 style="background:#000000; color:#FF6600;"|Big 12 Regular Season

|-
!colspan=12 style="background:#000000; color:#FF6600;"| 2014 Big 12 Men's Basketball tournament

TCU

|-
!colspan=9 style="background:#342A7B; color:#FFFFFF;"| Big 12 Regular Season

|-
!colspan=9 style="background:#342A7B; color:#FFFFFF;"| 2014 Big 12 Men's Basketball tournament

Texas

|-
!colspan=9 style="background:#CC5500; color:white;"| Big 12 Regular Season

|-
!colspan=9 style="background:#CC5500; color:white;"| 2014 Big 12 Men's Basketball tournament

Texas Tech

|-
!colspan=12 style="background:#CC0000; color:black;"| Big 12 Regular Season

|-
!colspan=12 style="background:#CC0000; color:black;"| 2014 Big 12 Men's Basketball tournament

West Virginia

|-
!colspan=9 style="background:#003366; color:#FFC600;"| Big 12 Regular Season
|-

|-
!colspan=9 style="background:#003366; color:#FFC600;"| 2014 Big 12 Men's Basketball tournament

Postseason

Big 12 tournament

  March 12–15, 2014–Big 12 Conference Basketball Tournament, Sprint Center, Kansas City, MO.

Bracket

* denotes overtime game

NCAA tournament

National Invitation tournament

References

External links
 Big 12 Men's Basketball